Breathing Lessons: The Life and Work of Mark O'Brien is a 1996 American short documentary film directed by Jessica Yu. It won an Oscar at the 69th Academy Awards in 1997 for Documentary Short Subject.

Mark O'Brien was a journalist and poet who lived in Berkeley, California. The documentary explored his spiritual struggle coping with his disability; he had to use an iron lung much of the time due to childhood polio. O'Brien died on July 4, 1999, from post-polio syndrome.

Cast
 Mark O'Brien as Himself
 Elizabeth Duvall as Herself
 Ian Berzon as Himself

References

External links

Breathing Lessons: The Life and Work of Mark O'Brien at Fanlight Productions

1996 films
1996 documentary films
1996 independent films
1990s American films
1990s English-language films
1990s short documentary films
American independent films
American short documentary films
Best Documentary Short Subject Academy Award winners
Documentary films about people with disability
Films directed by Jessica Yu